The Symphony No. 1 in F minor, Op. 10, by Dmitri Shostakovich was written in 1924–1925, and first performed in Leningrad by the Leningrad Philharmonic under Nicolai Malko on 12 May 1926. Shostakovich wrote the work as his graduation piece at the Petrograd Conservatory, completing it at the age of 19.

Structure

The work has four movements (the last two being played without interruption) and is approximately half an hour in length.

Instrumentation

The work is written for:

Woodwinds
Piccolo (doubling 3rd Flute)
2  Flutes (with 2nd doubling 2nd Piccolo)
2 Oboes
2 Clarinets
2 Bassoons

Brass
4 Horns
2 Trumpets
Alto trumpet
3 Trombones
Tuba

Percussion
Timpani
Bass drum
Snare drum
Tam-tam
Cymbals
Triangle
Glockenspiel

Keyboard
Piano

Strings
1st Violins
2nd Violins
Violas
Cellos
Double basses

Overview
While Shostakovich wrote this piece as his graduation exercise from Maximilian Steinberg's composition class, some of the material may have dated from considerably earlier. When the composer's aunt, Nadezhda Galli-Shohat, first heard the work at its American premiere by Leopold Stokowski and the Philadelphia Orchestra, she recognised in it many fragments she had heard young Mitya play as a child. Some of these fragments were associated with La Fontaine's retelling of Aesop's fable of The Ant and the Grasshopper and Hans Christian Andersen's The Little Mermaid.

The immediate parallel to the 19-year-old composer presenting his first symphony was Alexander Glazunov, himself a child prodigy who had his First Symphony performed at an even younger age. Glazunov may have recognised in Shostakovich an echo of his younger self. As director of the Petrograd Conservatory, Glazunov had followed Shostakovich's progress since his entrance at age 13. He also arranged for the premiere of Shostakovich's symphony, which took place 44 years after Glazunov's First Symphony had first been presented in the same hall. In another instance of déjà vu with Glazunov's early life, the symphony caused almost as much of a sensation as the appearance of the young Shostakovich on the stage awkwardly taking his bow.

This symphony was a tremendous success from its premiere, and is still considered today as one of Shostakovich's finest works. It displays an interesting and characteristic combination of liveliness and wit on the one hand, and drama and tragedy on the other. In some ways it is reminiscent of the works of Igor Stravinsky and Sergei Prokofiev. The transparent and chamber-like orchestration of the First Symphony is in quite a contrast to the Mahlerian orchestrations found in many of his later symphonies, and the assurance with which the composer imagines, then realises large-scale structure, is as impressive as his vigour and freshness of gesture.

Comparisons with Glazunov
Because, like Glazunov, Shostakovich was still a teenager when he wrote his First Symphony, it is only natural that some critics compare it with Glazunov's First Symphony. Just a comparison of both slow movements brings to light the full nature of Shostakovich's achievement. The 15-year-old Glazunov was immensely musical and articulate. However, while Shostakovich shows a considerable amount of inner resource, Glazunov falls back on the musical procedures of the Nationalists, such as Borodin and Rimsky-Korsakov. While Shostakovich reveals a large debt to the Russian symphonic tradition, it is the vital spiritual experience being conveyed that stands out, not the formulative influences in his style. Altogether, he shows an imagination and degree of compassion far beyond youthful insight.

Influences
Because of the traditionalist mindset of the Conservatory, Shostakovich did not discover the music of Igor Stravinsky until his late teens. The effect of hearing this music was instant and radical, with Stravinsky's compositions continuing to hold a considerable influence over Shostakovich. Some critics have suggested the First Symphony was influenced by Stravinsky's Petrushka, not just due to the prominence of the piano part in its orchestration but also due to the overall tone of satire in the first half of the symphony. Because the plot in Stravinsky's ballet chronicled the doomed antics of an animated puppet, it would have reflected his observations on the mechanical aspects of human behaviour and appealed directly to the satirist in him.

Petrushka would not have been his only influence in this vein. The idea of human beings as machines or marionettes, with their free wills bound by biology and behaviorism, was a theme very much in vogue. Musical examples included Arnold Schoenberg's Pierrot lunaire and Alban Berg's Wozzeck—both works that Shostakovich admired. Even his fondness for Charlie Chaplin, some argue, might have fallen into this category. Still another musical influence, suggested by the opening clarinet phrase which becomes used considerably in the course of the symphony, is Richard Strauss's tone poem Till Eulenspiegel's Merry Pranks.

At the end of the second movement, Shostakovich unveils his biggest surprise by turning the tone of the symphony, suddenly and without warning, from pathos and satire to tragedy. The influence likewise changes from Stravinsky to Tchaikovsky and Mahler, with Shostakovich showing that for a teenage composer he has much to say, and much of astonishing depth.

Notable recordings

Notable recordings of this symphony include:

* = Mono recording
Source: arkivmusic.com (recommended recordings selected based on critics reviews)

References

Bibliography
 Layton, Robert, ed. Robert Simpson, The Symphony, Volume Two: Mahler to the Present Day (New York: Drake Publishers Inc., 1972).
 MacDonald, Ian, The New Shostakovich (Boston: Northeastern University Press, 1990). .
 Steinberg, Michael, The Symphony (Oxford and New York: Oxford University Press, 1995). .
 Volkov, Solomon, tr. Bouis, Antonina W., Saint Petersburg: A Cultural History (New York: Harper & Row, 1979). .

External links
 
 Full orchestral score from the New York Philharmonic's archives

Symphony No. 01 (Shostakovich)
Compositions in F minor
1925 compositions